Edward Frost (April 27, 1801 – July 21, 1868) was an American politician and jurist.

Frost was born in Charleston, S. C., April 27, 1801.  His father, the Rev. Thomas Frost, was rector of St. Philip's Church, Charleston, and a graduate of Cambridge University, England, in 1780.  His mother was Elizabeth, daughter of Richard Downes, a merchant of Liverpool, and Mary (Le Jan) Downes, from South Carolina.  He graduated from Yale College in 1820.  He was admitted to the bar in Charleston in 1823, and settled there in practice. In 1832 he was U. S. District Attorney, but resigned his office because he could not conscientiously defend the constitutionality of the Tariff Laws.  Having already served several terms in the South Carolina State Legislature, he was elected by that body, in 1843, one of the Judges of the Court of Common Pleas for life, but resigned the position, after a little more than ten years, on account of the great labor involved.  Judge Frost afterward devoted himself mainly to the carrying out of the Blue Ridge Railroad enterprise, being for many years President of the road. He cordially supported his State in her act of secession during the American Civil War, and died in the belief that she was right. He was married Oct. 19, 1826, to Miss Harriet Vander H. Horry, by whom he had eleven children. One son was destroyed by the explosion of the magazine in Fort Sumter in 1864.  Judge Frost was a brother of the Rev. Thomas D. Frost.

Frost died in Charleston July 21, 1868, aged 67 years and 3 months.

External links

1801 births
1868 deaths
Politicians from Charleston, South Carolina
Yale College alumni
South Carolina lawyers
Members of the South Carolina General Assembly
American railroad executives
19th-century American politicians
Lawyers from Charleston, South Carolina
Businesspeople from Charleston, South Carolina
19th-century American businesspeople
19th-century American lawyers